Miron Ben Ruina (מירון בן רוינה; born March 25, 1998) is a Finnish-Israeli basketball player for Hapoel Gilboa Galil of the Israeli Basketball Premier League. He plays the power forward and center positions.

Biography
Ruina was born in Helsinki, Finland. His father is Israeli, and his mother is Finnish. He moved to Israel with his family shortly after he was born. He is 6' 8" (202 cm) tall, and weighs 230 pounds (104 kg).

Professional career
He played for Hapoel Kfar Saba (2016-17), Hapoel Galil Elyon (2017-19), and Elitzur Yavne (2019-20).

Ruina played for Hapoel Eilat in the Israeli Basketball Premier League from 2020-22.

On July 13, 2022, he signed with Hapoel Gilboa Galil of the Israeli Basketball Premier League.

Israeli national team
He played for the Israeli national basketball team in the 2014 U16 FIBA European Championship Men, the 2015 FIBA U18 European Championship Men (winning a silver medal), the 2016 FIBA U18 European Championship, the 2017 FIBA U20 European Championship (silver medal), and the 2018 FIBA U20 European Championship (gold medal).

References

External links
Instagram page

1998 births
Living people
Finnish expatriate basketball players
Finnish expatriate sportspeople in Israel
Finnish men's basketball players
Finnish people of Israeli descent
Hapoel Eilat basketball players
Hapoel Galil Elyon players
Hapoel Gilboa Galil Elyon players
Hapoel Kfar Saba B.C. players
Israeli men's basketball players
Israeli people of Finnish descent